The L’Enrajolada Santacana House-Museum, in Martorell (Baix Llobregat), is one of the oldest museums in Catalonia. It was founded in 1876 by Francesc Santacana i Campmany (1810-1896) and then taken over by his grandson, Francesc Santacana i Romeu (1883-1936). It is located in an old private residence with four floors and a garden, which belonged to the Santacana family. L'Enrajolada is part of the Barcelona Provincial Council Local Museum Network.

Collection
The collections are very varied and come from all over: There are tiles from the 14th through to the 20th century, ceramic pieces, architectural elements and sculptures from ancient buildings, paintings from the 19th century, furniture and decorative elements. In addition, there is archaeological material from excavations carried out by Francesc Santacana in Martorell and the surrounding area.

See also
 Vicenç Ros Municipal Museum

References

External links
 Local Museum Network site

Barcelona Provincial Council Local Museum Network
Buildings and structures in Baix Llobregat
Historic house museums in Catalonia